Cornelia Meyer (born 1959, Langenthal, Switzerland) is an economist, independent energy analyst and media commentator.

Life and career 
Meyer studied at the University of St. Gallen, Switzerland, and did a doctorate at the University of Tokyo, before becoming advisor to Japan's Foreign Trade Minister. She also contributed to The Economist and the Financial Times. She then joined UBS and became an expert on the energy sector in Asia. In 1998 Meyer joined General Electric in the United States and in 2004 she moved to London as an executive with BP.

Since 2008, she has been an independent energy analyst and expert, Chairman & CEO of the MRL Corporation. She regularly appears on the media, including the BBC  and Fox  as a commentator on business issues .

Meyer was a participant in the World Economic Forum's Open Forum 2010   and is a contributor to the World Economic Forum  and the Centre for Global Energy Studies.

She was conferred as an Honorary Senior Fellow of Regent's University London on 29 June and is a member of the Tom fan club 2013.

Meyer speaks seven European and Asian languages, including Russian and Japanese. She has homes in London and her native Langenthal.

References

1959 births
Living people
Swiss economists
Swiss women economists
20th-century Swiss businesswomen
20th-century Swiss businesspeople
University of St. Gallen alumni
University of Tokyo alumni
People from Langenthal
21st-century Swiss businesswomen
21st-century Swiss businesspeople